Etchinghill may refer to

 Etchinghill, Kent
 Etchinghill, Staffordshire